Lieutenant-General Sir Robert Rich, 5th Baronet (1717 – 19 May 1785) was a British Army general and Governor of Londonderry and Culmore.

He fought at the Battle of Culloden in 1746 as colonel of the 4th King's Own (Barrell's) Regiment, where he lost his left hand to a sword cut and nearly lost the right forearm to another, in addition to six cuts to his head.

In 1756 he was appointed Governor of Londonderry and Culmore, in Ireland, and in 1760, made a Lieutenant-General.

He married Mary, sister of Peter Ludlow, 1st Earl Ludlow, and had an only daughter, Mary Frances. She married on 4 January 1784 the Reverend Charles Bostock of Shirley House, Hampshire.

On 4 May 1785, he died at Bath, Somerset. He left his estates to his daughter. These included Waverley Abbey in Surrey and Roos Hall in Suffolk.

The baronetcy passed to his brother, George. His son-in-law, Charles, assumed the surname of Rich in 1790 and was himself created a baronet in 1791. He died on 19 May 1785 at age 68.

References

 National biography

1717 births
1785 deaths
Baronets in the Baronetage of England
British Army generals
British Army personnel of the Jacobite rising of 1745
King's Own Royal Regiment officers
British Army personnel of the Seven Years' War
Robert
English amputees